Thahtay Island, also known as Thahtay Kyun and Son Island, is a small Burmese island within the Mergui Archipelago in the Andaman Sea. The island is directly adjacent to Ranong, a city in the south of Thailand and to Kawthaung (formerly Victoria Point).  The island has been given by the Burmese government on a long term concession to a Thailand-based VES Group for development as a tourism. Grand Andaman is a five star casino club golf resort now operating on the island.

References

External links
 mergui.org

Mergui Archipelago